Sergio Lobato García (21 May 1955 – 31 August 2019) was a Mexican politician from the Institutional Revolutionary Party. From 2009 to 2012 he served as Deputy of the LXI Legislature of the Mexican Congress representing Chiapas. He previously served as municipal president of San Cristóbal de las Casas and as a local deputy in the LXIII Legislature of the Congress of Chiapas. He died on 31 August 2019 in Mexico City.

References

1955 births
2019 deaths
Institutional Revolutionary Party politicians
Members of the Congress of Chiapas
Municipal presidents in Chiapas
Politicians from Chiapas
21st-century Mexican politicians
Deputies of the LXI Legislature of Mexico
Members of the Chamber of Deputies (Mexico) for Chiapas